The historical European national basketball league rankings are the rankings for each of the different European regional and domestic basketball leagues that are or were eligible to participate in Europe's international continental professional club basketball competitions.

History
Over the history of European-wide club basketball competitions, dating back to the old FIBA European Champions Cup (now known as the EuroLeague), which began in 1958, three European national domestic leagues stood out in prominence under the old ratings system that was based only on basketball game competition results, and was originally overseen by FIBA, and then later by Euroleague Basketball Company. The Italian Lega A, which was the top league historically, the Spanish ACB, which was the second best league historically, and the Greek Basket League, which was the third best league historically. The old ratings system, which was used from 1958–2007, included only basketball game competition related results.

Also, the old USSR Premiere League, and the old Yugoslav First Federal League, were additional leagues that historically were among the elite of Europe before they folded. The old Yugoslav First Federal League exists in a similar form today, as the Adriatic ABA League, and the old USSR Premiere League exists in a similar form today, as the VTB United League.

FIBA EuroLeague domestic league rankings (by country) 1958 – 2001
The FIBA EuroLeague domestic league rankings (by country), from 1958–2001, including the FIBA SuproLeague 2000–01 season. These were the domestic league rankings that were based on play in the first-tier European competition, the EuroLeague. These rankings were part of the old rating system, which was used from 1958–2007, and included only basketball game competition related results as rankings criteria.

Euroleague Basketball domestic league rankings (by country) 2000 – 2007
The Euroleague Basketball Company domestic league rankings (by country), from 2000–2007. These were the domestic league rankings that were based on play in the first-tier European competition, the EuroLeague. These rankings were part of the old rating system, which was used from 1958–2007, and included only basketball game competition related results, as a rankings criteria.

Overall combined European domestic league rankings (by country) 1958 – 2007
The overall combined European domestic league rankings (by country), from 1958–2007. These were the all-time domestic league rankings that were based on play in all of the European continental-wide club basketball competitions, the EuroLeague, the Saporta Cup, the Korać Cup, the EuroCup, the EuroChallenge, and the EuroCup Challenge. These rankings were part of the old rating system, which was used from 1958–2007, and included only basketball game competition related results, as a rankings criteria.

Top 3 ranked leagues in the overall combined rankings 1958 – 2007

2007 – 2012 ranking
The rankings, as of 2007, are based on 70 percent basketball game competition results, and 30 percent TV revenues/ratings, attendance figures, and arena capacities. The allocation criteria are based in this ranking.

2012
The rankings, as of 2007, are based on 70 percent basketball game competition results, and 30 percent TV revenues/ratings, attendance figures, and arena capacities. The allocation criteria are based in this ranking.

In 2012, Euroleague Basketball decided to update the rankings every year, and take into account the results from the previous seasons.

See also
ULEB
EuroLeague
EuroCup
FIBA Europe
EuroChallenge

References

External links
European Basketball Results Rankings 1957–2007 
EuroChallenge Website
Official FIBA Europe Web Site
TalkBasket.net Forum
Interbasket.net Forum

EuroLeague statistics
Basketball leagues in Europe
Basketball rankings